Gianluca Temelin (Pescara, 5 August 1976), is an Italian former footballer who played as a striker.

Playing career
Temelin played in Italy's professional leagues for 19 years, scoring more than 100 goals in just over 400 competitive matches. He began his career with Serie A's Atalanta B.C. where he had a brief spell with the senior side.

Cresciuto calcisticamente nell'Atalanta dove esordi' in Serie B il 23 Dicembre 94 contro il Piacenza (0:0), a termine della stagione l'Atalanta torna in serie A. Nella stagione successiva esordisce in serie A il 25 Febbraio 96 in Inter-Atalanta 1:0,mentre il 18 Maggio 96 subentra nella finale di ritorno di Coppa Italia contro la Fiorentina allenata da Claudio Ranieri.

Terminata la carriera da calciatore nel Maggio 2014, a Settembre dello stesso anno inizia la sua nuova carriera da Allenatore nel Settore Giovanile della Pro Patria( Under 15), dal 1 Agosto 2015 al 30 Giugno 2017 allena nel Settore Giovanile del Pescara Calcio (Under 15,16).
Dal 1 Agosto 2017 diventa Vice Allenatore in Serie D al Francavilla al Mare fino al 30 Giugno 2018, dal 1 Luglio 2018 entra a far parte del Settore Giovanile della Cremonese dove tutt'ora allena l'Under 17

Honours
ATALANTA: PROMOZIONE IN SERIE A 1994/1995

ALBINESE: SEMIFINALE PLAY OFF C2 1997/1998

MESSINA: PROMOZIONE IN SERIE A  2003/2004

CREMONESE: FINALE PLAY OFF 2007/2008

REGGIANA: SEMIFINALE PLAY OFF 2009/2010

References

External links
Profile at Soccerway.com

Italian footballers
Atalanta B.C. players
U.C. AlbinoLeffe players
Treviso F.B.C. 1993 players
S.P.A.L. players
A.C.R. Messina players
S.S.D. Pro Sesto players
U.S. Cremonese players
Serie A players
Serie B players
Association football forwards
Sportspeople from Pescara
1976 births
Living people
A.S.D. SolbiaSommese Calcio players
Footballers from Abruzzo